"MC's Act Like They Don't Know" is a song from KRS-One's 1995 eponymous album. It contains production from DJ Premier that samples "Yesterdays" by Clifford Brown, and interpolates "The Breaks" by Kurtis Blow. Its lyrics deal with how many rappers who achieve positive chart positions and other commercial awards cannot perform well live.

Album appearances
Besides appearing on KRS-One and on the "MC's Act Like They Don't Know/Represent the Real Hip-Hop" single, it has appeared on many compilation albums. It appeared on compilations including 1996's Hip Hop's Most Wanted, 1997's Gangsta Hip Hop, Vol. 5, Hot Joints, Vol. 1, 1999's Best of D&D Studios, Vol. 1, 1999's Discover the Rhythm of Hip Hop, 1999's Ill Rated, 1999's Real Hip-Hop: Best of D & D, Vol. 1, 2000's A Retrospective, 2002's Hip Hop, Vol. 2, 2002's Rappers Delight and 2003's Best of Rapture's Delight.

Cover versions

In 2010 a new version of the song appeared on the mixtape album 'Survival Kit' which is a tribute to KRS One and his collaborative partner Buckshot. This new version of the song features Sha Stimuli, Promise, J.A.M.E.S. Watts and Fashawn and is available for free download at duckdown.com

Samples

Lyrics from "MC's Act Like They Don't Know" are sampled in "Anticipation" by M.O.P., "Rise of the Machines" by Jedi Mind Tricks and "Hardcore Hip Hop" by Rawcotiks.

Track listing
A-side
 MC's Act Like They Don't Know (LP Version) (4:44)
 MC's Act Like They Don't Know (Instrumental) (4:44)

B-side
 Represent the Real Hip-Hop (Street) (3:20)
 Represent the Real Hip-Hop (Clean) (3:20)
 Represent the Real Hip-Hop (Instrumental) (2:50)

Charts

Weekly charts

References

1995 singles
KRS-One songs
Song recordings produced by DJ Premier
1995 songs
Jive Records singles
Songs written by KRS-One
Songs written by DJ Premier